Santiago High School may refer to:
Santiago High School (Corona, California)
Santiago High School (Garden Grove, California)